Tridecane or n-tridecane is an alkane with the chemical formula CH3(CH2)11CH3. Tridecane is a combustible colourless liquid.  In industry, they have no specific value aside from being components of various fuels and solvents.  In the research laboratory, tridecane is also used as a distillation chaser.

Natural occurrence
Nymphs of the southern green shield bug produce tridecane as a dispersion/aggregation pheromone, which possibly serves as a defense against predators. It is also the main component of the defensive fluid produced by the stink bug Cosmopepla bimaculata.

See also
 Higher alkanes
 List of isomers of tridecane

References

External links
 Material Safety Data Sheet for Tridecane
 Phytochemical and Ethnobotanical Databases

Alkanes
Hydrocarbon solvents